The title Princess of Turenne was used by the daughters-in-law of the Dukes of Bouillon as wives of the Princes of Turenne, heirs to Bouillon and Sedan.

House of La Tour d'Auvergne, 1691-1794

References

 
Duchesses of Bouillon
Lists of princesses
La Tour d'Auvergne
French princesses